Da-rae, also spelled Da-lae, is a Korean feminine given name. Unlike most Korean names, which are composed of two Sino-Korean roots each written with one hanja, "Darae" is an indigenous Korean name: a single word meaning "gooseberry". It is one of a number of such indigenous names which became more popular in South Korea in the late 20th century.

People
People with this name include:
 Jeong Da-rae (born 1991), South Korean former swimmer
 Kim Da-rae (born 1987), South Korean field hockey player

Fictional characters
Fictional characters with this name include:
 Da-rae, in the 2014 South Korean television series Dr. Frost
 Yoon Da-rae, in the 2016 South Korean television drama Pinocchio's Nose

See also
List of Korean given names

References

Given names
Korean feminine given names